Anas Fattar (born 12 May 1987) is a Moroccan tennis player.

Fattar has a career high ATP singles ranking of 599 achieved on 15 December 2008. He also has a career high ATP doubles ranking of 455, which was achieved on 9 August 2010. Fattar has won 7 ITF Futures doubles titles.

Fattar has represented Morocco at the Davis Cup.

Future and Challenger finals

Singles: 1 (0–1)

Doubles 12 (7–5)

Davis Cup

Participations: (4–2)

   indicates the outcome of the Davis Cup match followed by the score, date, place of event, the zonal classification and its phase, and the court surface.

References

External links

1987 births
Living people
Moroccan male tennis players
Sportspeople from Casablanca
Competitors at the 2019 African Games
African Games competitors for Morocco
African Games medalists in tennis
African Games gold medalists for Morocco
21st-century Moroccan people